Lorenzo Sonego was the defending champion but chose not to defend his title.

Thiago Monteiro won the title after defeating Andrea Pellegrino 6–1, 7–6(7–2) in the final.

Seeds

Draw

Finals

Top half

Bottom half

References

External links
Main draw
Qualifying draw

AON Open Challenger - 1
2022 Singles